Psydrax pergracilis is a species of flowering plant in the family Rubiaceae. It is endemic to Kerala in India.

References

pergracilis
Endemic flora of India (region)
Endangered plants
Taxonomy articles created by Polbot